The San Antonio Bears were a minor league baseball team located in San Antonio, Texas. The Bears played in the Texas League from 1920 through 1928. Their home stadium was League Park.

Season records

Source:

League leaders
 1920: Ed Brown – hits (200)
 1923: Ike Boone – average (.402), runs (134), hits (241), RBIs (135)
 1925: Danny Clark – average (.399), hits (225)
 1926: Homer "Tiny" Owens – wins (22, tied)

See also
 :Category:San Antonio Bears players
 San Antonio Bronchos (preceding Texas League team)
 San Antonio Indians (succeeding Texas League team)

References

Further reading

External links
Ballpark information

Defunct Texas League teams
Defunct baseball teams in Texas
Professional baseball teams in Texas
Sports teams in San Antonio
Baseball teams established in 1920
1920 establishments in Texas
1928 disestablishments in Texas
Baseball teams disestablished in 1928